Marcel Stern (4 October 1909 – 2 August 1989) was a French composer and violinist.

Life 

Born in Paris, Stern studied at the Conservatoire de Paris and won the Premier Grand Prix de Rome in 1936 with the cantata Gisèle. After his stay at the Villa Medici in Rome, the Société Nationale performed his Divertissement for Orchestra in Paris in 1939.

The Second World War interrupted his musical career, but during this time he composed the Symphony "La Libération", which was premiered on the radio in 1945 and by the Concerts Colonne in 1948 at the Théâtre du Châtelet under the direction of Paul Paray. Among his other works are the Deux pièces pour flûte seule: Bucolique, Iberica (1964) and the Concerto pour piano et orchestre (1968). He also composed several transcriptions of works by other composers for violin and orchestra, including George Enescu's First Romanian Rhapsody.

Compositions

Classical works (selection) 
1935: Cantata Le Château endormi (deuxième Second Grand Prix de Rome)
1936: Cantata Gisèle (Premier Grand Prix de Rome)
1939: Divertissement for small orchestra
1945: Symphony La Libération in E
1964: Bucolique and Iberica, two pieces for flute solo
1968: Concerto for piano and orchestra (YouTube)

Cinema 
Marcel Stern also distinguished himself in the field of film music. Thus, from 1946 to 1963, he was responsible for the scores of fourteen French films (two, however, being French-Italian co-productions).
 1946: The Faceless Enemy by Robert-Paul Dagan and Maurice Cammage
 1947: Not guilty by Henri Decoin
 1948: Night Express by Marcel Blistène
 1949: Vient de paraître by Jacques Houssin
 1950: Le Grand Cirque by Georges Péclet
 1951: Avalanche by Raymond Segard
 1952: Love Is Not a Sin by Claude Cariven
1955: Men in White by Ralph Habib
 1956: In the Manner of Sherlock Holmes by Henri Lepage
 1957: Fernand clochard by Pierre Chevalier
 1958: Le Septième Ciel by Raymond Bernard (Franco-Italian film)
 1960: Colère froide by André Haguet and Jean-Paul Sassy
 1962: Rencontres by Philippe Agostini (Franco-Italian film)
 1963: La Soupe aux poulets by Philippe Agostini

References

External links 
 Marcel Stern on musimem.com
 Marcel Stern on Ciné ressources
 Marcel Stern on IMDb

1909 births
1989 deaths
Musicians from Paris
Conservatoire de Paris alumni
French classical composers
French male classical composers
20th-century French composers
Prix de Rome for composition
French film score composers
French male film score composers
20th-century French male musicians